Rufus Pereira (May 5, 1933 – May 2, 2012) was a Roman Catholic priest, author of publications on spiritual life, Doctor of theology and exorcist.

Biography
Born in Bandra, a suburb of Mumbai, India, he was ordained a priest in 1956. He received his doctorate in Biblical Theology from the Pontifical Gregorian University in Rome. After returning to India, he worked as a high school principal in Mumbai.

Since 1972 he was associated with the Catholic Movement for Renewal in the Holy Spirit. He published a monthly magazine devoted to the Catholic charismatic renewal in India.

From 1994 he was the vice-president of the International Association of Exorcists, serving under president Gabriele Amorth.

In 1995 he initiated the International Association for the Ministry of Deliverance.

From 1997, as the successor of Emiliano Tardif, he was a member of the International Catholic Charismatic Council for Renewal.

Preaching career 
The priest travelled to Europe and Brazil many times, preaching retreats. In the latter, he was a frequent preacher at Canção Nova, in the municipality of Cachoeira Paulista, state of São Paulo.

He was known for his phrase:"The devil hates me!"

Death 
He died in London in 2012 due to a heart stroke.

Books 
In Portuguese

 Who is Jesus?
 Jesus: a Master within reach of all
 The key to healing
 Steps to healing
 I bring you improvement and healing

References

1933 births
2012 deaths
Catholic exorcists
20th-century Indian Roman Catholic priests
People from Mumbai
Pontifical Gregorian University alumni
Charismatic and Pentecostal Christianity